Almen Bibic (born March 29, 1993) is a Swedish professional ice hockey defenceman. He is currently playing with Linköpings HC of the Swedish Hockey League (SHL).

Bibic made his Swedish Hockey League debut playing with Leksands IF during the 2013–14 SHL season.

References

External links

1993 births
Living people
Leksands IF players
Linköping HC players
Rögle BK players
Swedish ice hockey defencemen
People from Örnsköldsvik Municipality
Sportspeople from Västernorrland County